The FanWing is an aircraft configuration in which a horizontal-axis cross-flow fan is used in close conjunction with a fixed wing. The fan forces airflow over the fixed surface to provide both lift and forward thrust.

The concept was initially developed around 1997 by designer Patrick Peebles and is under development by his company FanWing Ltd. As of December 2018, only experimental drones have been flown.

Principles of operation
A cross-flow fan comprises blades radiating from a central axis and aligned with the axis, similar to those of a cylinder mower. It is contained in a duct which is shaped so that when the fan spins, it induces a directional airflow. In the FanWing, the fan is set above the leading section of a fixed wing and extends the full span of the wing. The wing upper surface is shaped around the fan to form a half-duct. The wing chord extends approximately as far again back from the fan, with the rear section shaped as a wedge-like fairing that extends to the trailing edge.

When the fan spins with the upper edge moving backwards and the lower edge forwards, the fixed half-duct is shaped to create a net backward flow of air, resulting in forward thrust. This backward flow over the upper surfaces also creates a net circulation of air around the rotor-wing combination, resulting in vertical lift.

Addition of an outboard tail recovers energy from the wing tip vortices to significantly increase overall efficiency. This in turn allows an even lower minimum forward speed.

Advantages
In addition to providing forward thrust in its own right, the radial fan increases the velocity of the airflow over the wing's upper surface independently of the forward motion of the aircraft, thereby creating useful lift at forward speeds lower than the stalling speed for a conventional wing.

Limitations
Besides the added weight and complexity of the fan system, it has some limitations compared with a conventional fixed wing:
 The fan speed directly affects pitch. This means that, paradoxically, increasing the engine power can decelerate the aircraft.
 Glide ratio in case of power failure is low (about 1:3) but if the rotors are allowed to auto-rotate, the aircraft can still glide.
 The rotating fan can cause gyroscopic effects which can affect manoeuvrability.

History
Although the cross-flow fan has been known since the late nineteenth century, its use as a rotary aircraft wing was not studied until 1997 when Patrick Peebles, an American based in the UK, conceived of it as a STOL device and subsequently formed the FanWing Co. Wind tunnel tests and powered model flights were supported by UK government funding, winning SMART grant awards in 2002 and 2003. Work began on a prototype drone, ostensibly aimed at the STOL urban surveillance market. The benefits of adding a tail were discovered during continued development. By 2014, support for wind tunnel tests of a 1.5 meter wing section was being provided through EU sources including €783,000 through the German Aerospace Center.

As of December 2018, only unmanned development prototypes have flown.

See also
 Flettner airplane
 Rotary-wing aircraft
 Ornithopter
 Gyroplane

References & notes

External links

 FanWing Ltd company website
 Image of research model with early tail configuration, FlightGlobal (Archived copy).

Aircraft configurations
Aircraft wing design